Official website https://www.gerard-vergnaud.org

Gérard Vergnaud (8 February 1933 – 6 June 2021) was a French mathematician, philosopher, educator, and psychologist. He earned his doctorate from the International Center for Genetic Epistemology in Geneva under the supervision of Jean Piaget. Vergnaud was a professor emeritus of the Centre national de la recherche scientifique in Paris, where he was a researcher in mathematics. Among his most significant work has been the development of the Theory of Conceptual Fields, which describes how children develop an understanding of mathematics.

External links 
Gérard Vergnaud – Association pour la Recherche en Didactique des Mathématiques
Ciencia al Día – "Horror a las matemáticas"  (accessed 29 January 2011).

References

1933 births
2021 deaths
French psychologists
French mathematicians
20th-century French philosophers
French male non-fiction writers
Philosophers of mathematics
People from Maine-et-Loire